HMS Shelanagig (or Sheelanagig, or other variants), was a sloop of 16-guns purchased in the West Indies in 1780 for the Royal Navy. She was under the command of James Shepherd, (or Keith Shepherd, or Commander J.K. Sheppard), and her Second Lieutenant was Home Popham.

The three took different routes. Still, on 28 May 1781 near St Lucia Shelanagig encountered the French fleet under Comte de Grasse, which captured her. Also, on 4 June the French captured Fly. Only Munster Lass managed to rejoin the British fleet.

French records indicate that Shelanagigs ultimate fate is unknown. British records do report that the West India squadron recaptured the sloop Schelanagig, of 16 guns, in 1782, but do not report a subsequent disposition.

Shelanagigs officers were paroled after the capture of their vessel, with Popham returning to Demerara and Shepherd and ship's master Edward Park(e) travelling direct to England. Shepherd and Park were court martialed on 23 January 1782. Their evidence was that Shelanigig had been outnumbered six to one; that the French vessels had sailed faster than their own, and that heavy winds had so heeled the British ship towards the French that she had been unable to aim or fire her guns. Shepherd and Park were acquitted of any misconduct. Popham was not called, as he had not yet returned to England, and his fellow officer's acquittal indicated there was no case to answer. All three returned to active service, with Popham being promoted to First Lieutenant aboard .

Notes

Citations

References
 
Freitag, Barbara (2004) Sheela-Na-Gigs: Unravelling An Enigma. (Psychology Press).
 
 

1780s ships
Sloops of the Royal Navy
Captured ships